Pinna attenuata is a species of bivalves belonging to the family Pinnidae.

The species is found in Japan, Malesia.

References

Pinnidae